Yan'an, alternatively spelled as Yenan is a prefecture-level city in the Shaanbei region of Shaanxi province, China, bordering Shanxi to the east and Gansu to the west. It administers several counties, including Zhidan (formerly Bao'an), which served as the headquarters of the Chinese Communists before the city of Yan'an proper took that role.

Yan'an was near the endpoint of the Long March, and became the center of the Chinese Communist revolution from late 1935 to early 1947. Chinese communists celebrate Yan'an as the birthplace of the revolution.

As of 2019, Yan'an has approximately 2,255,700 permanent residents.

History

Yan'an was populated at least as early as the Xia Dynasty. During the Spring and Autumn Period, the area was inhabited by the Beidi people. The area became an important defensive outpost for the subsequent Tang dynasty, which renamed the area Yanzhou in 758 CE. Yanzhou was a location of strategic military importance for the Chinese empire and Tanguts of the Western Xia Dynasty. It was once successfully defended by the Song Dynasty era Chinese scientist, statesman, and general Shen Kuo. However, it was eventually taken over by the Tanguts in 1082 once Shen's defensive victories were marginalized and sacrificed by the new Chancellor Cai Que (who handed the city over to the Tanguts as terms of a peace treaty). In 1089, under the Song Dynasty, Yanzhou was renamed to Yan'an, and was promoted to a fu. Yan'an and the whole of Shaanxi were taken over by the Mongols in the late 1220s, only after their leader Genghis Khan had died during the siege of the Western Xia capital in 1227. After the fall of the Qing Dynasty, the city became part of the newly created Republic of China, and was reorganized by the Republican government in 1913 under .

Red Capital

In 1934, two regional soviets were established. In October 1935, following the Long March, forces of the Chinese Red Army arrived in the area from Jiangxi. The following month, communist forces established a regional government in Wayaobao and re-organized regional soviet administrations. In May 1936, the area was re-organized by communist forces as Shaan-Gan-Ning Province. In December 1936, at the start of the Second United Front, Yan'an was taken over by the Chinese Communists.  When Edgar Snow went there in 1936, it was under Kuomintang control and a Red army siege had recently been lifted.  Unknown to him at the time, there had also been contacts there between the Communists and the generals who later staged the Xi'an Incident.  Snow actually met Mao at Bao'an (Pao An).

Having rebelled against Chiang, the local warlords decided to hand over Yan'an to the Communists, who were now allies. They pulled out, and in January 1937, the Red Army entered Yan'an, without a fight. This is described by Agnes Smedley in her book Battle Hymn of China. She was in Xi'an at the time and got to Yan'an shortly after the take-over.

On September 6, 1937, Yan'an became the seat of the communist government of what became known as the Shaanxi-Gansu-Ningxia Border Region. It became the center for intensive training of party members and army troops. In 1941, Mao Zedong put special influence on a series of training programs to "correct unorthodox tendencies" and essentially mold the peasantry to the communist model. One of the first CPC programs launched was the Yan'an Rectification Movement.

World War II and Chinese Civil War
During the Second World War almost all buildings, except a pagoda, were destroyed by Japanese bombing, and most inhabitants took to living in yaodongs, artificial caves or dugouts carved into hillsides which were traditional dwellings in Shaanxi. While Yan'an was the center of Chinese communist life many prominent Western journalists including Edgar Snow and Anna Louise Strong met with Mao Zedong and other important leaders for interviews. Other Westerners, such as Hsiao Li and Michael Lindsay, were part of the resistance movement in Yan'an.

Beginning in 1944, Yan'an played host to the United States Army Observation Group, also known as the Dixie Mission. This group sought to establish relations with Chinese Communist forces, investigate the Communist Party politically and militarily, and determine whether the United States should back Communist forces. Prominent Americans tasked with evaluating the Communist forces politically and militarily include John S. Service of the United States Department of State, and Colonel David D. Barrett of the United States Army. The mission explored possible plans for cooperation against the Japanese. The Americans had a presence in Yan'an from 1944 to 1947.

Yan'an was briefly captured in the Battle of Yan'an by the Kuomintang forces in the Chinese Civil War. The Communist leadership learned of a planned attack in advance and decided to pull out. From then until their capture of Beijing they were usually based somewhere else, often with a mobile headquarters.

People's Republic of China
In May 1950, under the People's Republic of China, Yan'an was re-organized as Yan'an District, and was further re-organized as a special district in October. Yan'an was later established as an area.

On November 5, 1996, Yan'an Area was revoked and established as a prefecture-level city.

Geography and climate
Yan'an is located in northern Shaanxi on the Loess Plateau, with a latitude spanning from 35°21′ to 37°31′ N, and a longitude spanning from 107°41′ t0 110°31′ E. The city is bordered by Yulin to the north, Xianyang, Tongchuan, and Weinan in the Guanzhong region to the south, Linfen and Lüliang of Shanxi to the east across the Yellow River, and Qingyang of Gansu to the west across the Ziwu Ridge. In addition to the Yellow River flowing through Yan'an, the city's major rivers include the Yan River and the Luo River.

Yan'an has a humid continental climate (Köppen climate classification Dwa) that borders on a steppe climate (Köppen BSk), with cold, dry, and moderately long winters, and hot, somewhat humid summers. Spring and autumn are short transition seasons in between. The area receives  of precipitation, 47% of which falls in July and August. Yan’an averages around 300 days of sunshine per year.

Administrative divisions

Demographics 
As of 2019, Yan'an has approximately 2,255,700 permanent residents, a slight decrease from the 2,259,400 recorded in 2018. As of 2019, there are 2,336,587 people with a Yan'an hukou registration. This discrepancy reflects China's system of internal migration, as many hukou holders in more rural areas migrate to larger and more developed cities.

Approximately 674,700 people lived in Yan'an's two districts (Baota and Ansai) as of 2019.

Vital statistics 
In 2019, Yan'an recorded a birth rate of 9.80‰ (per thousand), and a death rate of 5.97‰, giving the city a rate of natural increase of 3.83‰. This is a slight decrease from 2018, when the rate of natural increase was 4.30‰.

Income 
In 2019, urban households earned an average disposable income of 34,888 RMB, an 8.3% increase from the previous year. Rural households earned a lower average of 11,876 RMB, reflecting a 10.1% increase from the previous year.

Economy 

Like much of China, Yan'an's economy has rapidly developed in the 21st century. Yan'an's gross domestic product (GDP) in 2019 stood at 166.389 billion RMB, more than ten times its GDP in 2000, which stood at just 13.063 billion RMB. Yan'an recorded a 6.7% increase to GDP in 2019, down from the 8.9% growth recorded in 2018, and below the peak of 19.6% annual GDP growth the city achieved in 2004. The GDP per capita of Yan'an totals 73,703 RMB as of 2019, a 6.9% increase from the previous year. Of Yan'an's county-level divisions, Baota District recorded the largest GDP in 2019, totaling 36.391 billion RMB. Baota District is followed by Luochuan County and Huangling County, which recorded economic outputs totaling 24.387 billion and 18.593 billion RMB, respectively.
Yan'an is largely reliant on its secondary sector, which comprises the majority of its GDP as of 2019.

Agriculture 

As of 2019, the city's output in the fields of agriculture, forestry, animal husbandry, and fishing totals 26.107 billion RMB. Of this, farming accounted for 21.798 billion RMB, animal husbandry accounted for 2.987 billion RMB, forestry accounted for 621.17 million RMB, fishing accounted for 72.82 million RMB, and agricultural services accounted for 628.32 million RMB.

The total area of Yan'an's farmland in 2019 is 183.30 thousand hectares, of which, 72.79 thousand hectares are used for growing maize. Sizable tracts of land in Yan'an are also used to grow vegetables and soybeans. Yan'an has the second largest cotton production out of all the prefecture-level cities in Shaanxi, behind just Weinan. The city also grows a large amount of rapeseeds, peanuts, apples, jujubes, and apricots. Yan'an is also the second largest honey producer in Shaanxi, behind Hanzhong.

Industry 
As of 2019, the city's industrial output is worth 96.510 billion RMB, a 6.4% increase from the previous year at constant prices. In 2018, the petroleum industry alone accounted for 54.419 billion RMB of output. In addition to oil and natural gas, major industries in the city include coal mining, power generation, and cigarette production.

Petroleum Industry 
Yan'an is a major oil and gas center in China. In 2018, 15,292,400 tons of crude oil were extracted from the city. Of this, 8,565,800 tons were extracted by Yanchang Petroleum, and the remaining 6,726,600 tons were extracted as part of CNPC's Changqing Oil Field. The Changqing Oil Field, part of the wider Ordos basin, one of China's main petroleum-producing regions, has been home to oil extraction since the early 1970s.

Retail 
The total retail sales of consumer goods in Yan'an totaled 41.113 billion RMB in 2019. The majority of these retail sales took place in Baota District, which recorded 24.000 billion RMB of sales that year.

Culture 
The Erdao Street Night Market is a street market in Baota District which features many of the hallmarks of Shaanbei culture, including local cuisine, décor, and folk music.

Tourism 

The city is a major center for Red Tourism in China, with facilities such as the Yan’an Revolution Memorial Hall attracting Chinese citizens and Communist Party cadres seeking to learn more about the Party's history.

Transportation
Yan'an Nanniwan Airport
G2211 Changyan Expressway
G65 Baotou–Maoming Expressway
China National Highway 210

Education 
Yan'an is home to 251 standard primary schools and 112 standard secondary schools, enrolling 218,100 and 129,900 students, respectively. The city also has 556 kindergartens, enrolling 119,500 students. The city also has 5 special education schools, serving 372 disabled students. As of 2019, Yan'an has 13 public libraries.

Notable Educational Institutions 

China Yan'an Executive Leadership Academy

Healthcare 
Yan'an is home to 2,631 healthcare institutions as of 2019, which contain 14,560 medical beds, and are staffed by 24,298 employees.

See also 
Yan'an Rectification Movement
Yan'an Talks on Literature and Art
2693 Yan'an

References

External links

Official website of Yan'an Government
Yan'an (China) – Britannica Online Encyclopedia

 
Cities in Shaanxi